Detective Book Magazine was an American pulp science fiction magazine, published by Fiction House in 1930 to 1931 and from 1937 to 1952. Each edition of Detective Book Magazine contained the complete text of a detective novel. Most editions also contained one or more shorter detective fiction stories. Its main competitor was Street & Smith's Detective Story Magazine.

Publication history 
Detective Book Magazine was first published in April 1930 and monthly issues followed until the magazine was discontinued after the September 1931 edition.

The magazine was revived with the publication of an issue in 1937, and until 1952 the magazine was published as a quarterly (though in some years, only three issues were published, and in each of 1950 through 1952 only one issue was published). In total, 65 editions of Detective Book Magazine were published.

External links
Detective Book Magazine: Checklist

Defunct magazines published in the United States
Pulp magazines
Magazines established in 1930
Magazines disestablished in 1952
Detective fiction
Mystery fiction magazines